The men's shot put event at the 1997 European Athletics U23 Championships was held in Turku, Finland, on 10 July 1997.

Medalists

Results

Final
10 July

Qualifications
10 July
Qualify: first to 12 to the Final

Participation
According to an unofficial count, 20 athletes from 14 countries participated in the event.

 (1)
 (1)
 (1)
 (1)
 (1)
 (2)
 (2)
 (2)
 (1)
 (2)
 (1)
 (1)
 (1)
 (3)

References

Shot put
Shot put at the European Athletics U23 Championships